Knutsson is a Norwegian surname that may refer to

Allen Knutson, American mathematician
Brian Knutson, American psychologist and neuroscientist 
Byron Knutson (born 1929), American politician
Chris Knutson, American stand-up comedian
Coya Knutson (1912–1996), American politician 
Dagny Knutson (born 1992), American swimmer of Norwegian heritage 
Dana Knutson, American artist
David Knutson (born 1959), American politician, lawyer,a d judge
Elmer Knutson (1914–2001), Canadian businessman, activist and fringe politician 
Gar Knutson (born 1956), Canadian lawyer and politician
Gene Knutson (1932–2008), American football player
Greta Knutson (1899–1983), Swedish modernist visual artist, art critic, short story writer and poet
Harold Knutson (1880–1953), Norwegian-American politician and journalist
Heather A. Knutson, American astrophysicist 
Howard A. Knutson (1926-2006), American lawyer and politician
J. Knutson, Canadian folk singer-songwriter
Kristen L Knutson, neurologist studying sleep
Lars Knutson Liestøl (1839–1912), Norwegian politician
Milo Knutson (1917–1981), American politician
Olga Cecilia Knutson (1888–1969), Swedish-American animal trainer and actress
Oscar Knutson (1899–1981), American lawyer and judge 
Paul Knutson, 14th-century Norwegian law officer
Steve Knutson (born 1951), American football player 
Terry Teene (born Knutson, 1942–2012), American musician, vocalist, songwriter, and entertainer
Thomas Knutson, American climate scientist 
Trigg H. Knutson (1879-1952), American politician
Venke Knutson (born 1978), Norwegian singer
Zak Knutson (born 1974), American film director, producer, writer, and actor

See also
Knutsen
Knutsson

Norwegian-language surnames